Pedro Sáinz de Baranda y Borreiro (13 March 1787 – 16 December 1845) was a naval officer, industrialist, and liberal politician who, having served in the Spanish Navy during the Battle of Trafalgar, founded the Mexican Navy and led the naval blockade of Veracruz, which ended with the Spanish surrendering San Juan de Ulua Fort in 1825, the last portion of Mexican territory still in Spanish hands. This event is recognized as the culmination of the Mexican War of Independence. As a politician, he was elected as a deputy to the Cortes of Cádiz, which were tasked with drafting the Spanish Constitution of 1812 and, afterward, was also a deputy in the constituent assembly which drafted the Mexican Constitution of 1824. Later, in the 1830s, he served on two occasions as governor of Yucatán. After retiring from politics, he became an entrepreneur and, in 1834, he founded Aurora Yucateca, the first completely mechanized textile factory to use steam power successfully in Mexico, "a bold experiment in industrial revolution."

Early years and participation in the Battle of Trafalgar 
He was born in San Francisco de Campeche on 13 March 1787. He was the eldest son Pedro Sáinz de Baranda y Cano (1753–1840), a Spanish colonial administrator and hidalgo who had arrived to the New World as Minister of the Royal Treasury, and María Josefa de Borreiro y de la Fuente. The Sáinz de Baranda family belonged to the Spanish nobility and had a distinguished participation in liberal politics between the 18th and 20th centuries in Spain and in Mexico.

A relative of his, Pedro Sáinz de Baranda y Gorriti, served as the first democratically-elected Mayor of Madrid, defending the city during the Napoleonic invasion of the Iberian Peninsula.

At the age of 11, in 1798, he was embarked by his parents in a merchant ship that was heading to Spain to begin his instruction as a naval officer. He officially enlisted in the Spanish army on 18 October 1803, where he registered with the rank of midshipman (guardíamarina). In November 1804, he was promoted to Sub-lieutenant (Alférez de fragata) while serving aboard San Fulgencio under the command of Domingo Grandallana.

In 1796, encouraged by Napoleon's military victories, particularly the Rhine Campaign and the Italian Campaign, Manuel Godoy, the Spanish Prime Minister, had signed the Second Treaty of San Ildefonso, establishing a Franco-Spanish alliance and common war against Great Britain. The Treaty of Amiens (1802), signified a temporary truce in hostilities but this was broken two years later after the British carried out a surprise attack on a Spanish squadron that was carrying gold and silver bullion to Cádiz.  After this incident, the French and Spanish Navies planned to take control of the English Channel, allowing the Grande Armée to invade England. French and Spanish fleets under the command of French Admiral Villeneuve sailed from the port of Cádiz in the south of Spain on 18 October 1805.

Sáinz de Baranda was assigned to Santa Ana, a battleship, which formed part of a larger squadron under the command of Admiral Federico Gravina. Off the Cape Trafalgar, the Franco-Spanish squadron encountered the British fleet under Admiral Lord Nelson.

During the battle, the Santa Ana engaged HMS Royal Sovereign, a british ship-of-the-line under the command of Cuthbert Collingwood, 1st Baron Collingwood. During the engagement, Sáinz de Baranda sustained serious wounds; after the engagement, he was raised to the rank of Lieutenant; he was only eighteen.

He was elected as a deputy to the Cortes of Cádiz, which were tasked with drafting the Spanish Constitution of 1812.

By order of the Supreme Naval Command, he returned to his native Campeche in 1815 where he served in the Engineer Corps, tasked with supervising and strengthening the fortifications.

Foundation of the Mexican Navy and siege of San Juan de Ulúa 

After the fall of the Mexican Empire, Sáinz de Baranda was elected deputy to the constituent courts of Mexico, tasked with drafting the Constitution of Mexico (1824).

In 1822, he began working for the newly formed Mexican Ministry of the Navy and tasked with forming a fleet in the port of Veracruz. In the following years, he received the appointments of captain of the port of Campeche and that of the naval commander of the State of Yucatán. In 1825 he was appointed commander-general of the port of Veracruz.

In this capacity, he made the decision to attack the Castle of San Juan de Ulúa as it was still occupied by Spanish troops. After General Miguel Barragán tried and failed to take the Castle of San Juan de Ulúa by land, Captain Sainz de Baranda was tasked with organizing a naval blockade of the fortress, thereby preventing Spanish ships from resupplying their garrison. Sainz de Baranda organized a fleet of warships made up of 200 sailors and 100 gunners as well as a frigate and eight corvettes.

The fortress finally surrendered on 23 November 1825. By this joint military and naval action, Mexico's independence was fully consolidated and Spain lost her final foothold in Mexican territory. For his role in these events, Pedro Sainz de Baranda is considered the founder of the Mexican Navy.

To honor these facts, the "Navy Day" was instituted in Mexico on 23 November by a presidential decree signed by Carlos Salinas de Gortari.

Industrialist and founder of Aurora de Yucatán 
In 1834, together with John McGregor, a Scottish businessman and his silent partner, he founded Aurora Yucateca,  the first completely mechanized textile factory to use steam power successfully in Mexico; he is widely regarded as having introduced the industrial revolution to the country.

By 1840, Sáinz de Baranda's health had deteriorated notably and he had all but retired from public life, focusing entirely on his industrial pursuits. He collaborated with John Lloyd Stephens, the American explorer, in his research work on the Mayan culture in Yucatan. This collaboration is the partial subject of the book Stephens wrote with Frederick Catherwood, titled Incidents of Travel in Yucatán.

After the death of Sáinz de Baranda, the Yucatán peninsula was the victim of widespread destruction after the Mayans rebelled against the population of European descent (criollos) during the War of the Castes. During this period, Aurora de Yucatán was the victim of such vandalism that it was forced to shutdown.

Politics and his last years 

From 1830 he began a more political life holding various public positions, these included serving as mayor of Valladolid, vice-governor of Yucatán and, two periods as governor of Yucatan.

Sáinz de Baranda died in Mérida on 16 December 1845 at the age of 58.

His remains were deposited in Campeche Cathedral. In March 1987, President Miguel de la Madrid instructed that his remains should be transferred, with the corresponding military honors, to the Rotunda of the Illustrious Persons in Mexico City.

Descendants 

The Sáinz de Baranda family which had belonged to the Spanish nobility in the Old World became part of "the highest echelons of southeastern political royalty." in Mexico, where they became "a Campeche-based family long active in civil and military affairs."

Pedro Sáinz de Baranda was the father of Joaquín and Pedro Baranda.

Joaquín served as Chief Justice of the Supreme Court, governor of Campeche, senator, and, for nearly twenty years, served as a cabinet minister, being responsible for the foundation of the Public Prosecutor's Office (Procuraduría General de la República) and the Normal School (Escuela Normal de Profesores).

Another of his sons, general Pedro Baranda was a military officer who  fought for the liberal cause during the Reform War (1858 - 1861) and,  the French invasion of Mexico (1861–1867), under president Benito Juárez. He founded the federal states of Campeche (1862) and Morelos (1869). As a politician, he served as the first governor of Morelos and was later appointed interim governor of Tabasco. He was also a deputy in the constituent assembly which drafted the 1857 Federal Constitution.

Finally, Sainz de Baranda's great-grandson, José María Pino Suárez, was a key leader of the Mexican Revolution who served as vice-president of Mexico from 1911 until his assassination in 1913.

References 

Mexican Navy personnel
Governors of Yucatán (state)
1787 births
1845 deaths
People from Mérida, Yucatán
Spanish naval officers
Liberalism in Mexico
People of the Mexican War of Independence
Anglo-Spanish wars
Battle of Trafalgar
People from Campeche